Namukulu is one of the fourteen villages of Niue. With a population of 11 (2017 census), it is the smallest village on the island. It has an observation point located close to the Namukulu Cottages

The village was established in 1922 by people moving from Tuapa. It celebrated its centenary in 2022.

Geography
The village is located about 5 kilometres from Alofi, and lies between the villages of Tuapa and Hikutavake. There is a single resort, Namukulu Cottages & Spa.

References

Populated places in Niue
1922 establishments in Niue